Un giorno nella vita ("A Day in Life") is a 1946 Italian war film directed by Alessandro Blasetti. It was entered into the 1946 Cannes Film Festival. American title: "A Day In the Life".  This film was screened in 2009 at the Film Society of Lincoln Center's retrospective "Life Lessons" Italian Neorealism and the birth of modern cinema.

Plot
A group of partisans seek refuge in a cloistered convent.  The sisters reluctantly aid the ailing men, but not without terrible consequences.  A day in the life offers an image of a big tent Italy, in which the differences that had earlier cleaved society, especially between the church and the political Left, are temporarily tabled for the higher cause of national unity.

Cast

 Enzo Biliotti - Don Eusebio
 Elisa Cegani - Suor Maria
 Ada Colangeli - Suor Gaetana
 Ada Dondini - Madre Superiora
 Arnoldo Foà - Brusan
 Massimo Girotti - Luigi Monotti
 Flavia Grande - Suor Luisa
 Mariella Lotti - Suor Bianca
 Dante Maggio - Carlo
 Secondo Maronetto - Macchi
 Marcella Melnati - Suor Pace
 Luciano Mondolfo - Damiano Santoni
 Gino Mori - Rino
 Amedeo Nazzari - Captain De Palma
 Ave Ninchi - Suor Celeste
 Amalia Pellegrini - Suor Scolastica
 Adam Perkal - German Captain
 Antonio Pierfederici - Giovanni
 Rolando Purgatori - American doctor
 Goliarda Sapienza - Suor Speranza
 Dina Sassoli - Suor Teresa

References

External links

1946 films
1940s war films
1940s Italian-language films
Italian Campaign of World War II films
Films about Italian resistance movement
Italian black-and-white films
Films directed by Alessandro Blasetti
Films with screenplays by Cesare Zavattini
Films about Catholicism
Films scored by Enzo Masetti
Italian war films
Italian World War II films
1940s Italian films